Premna tahitensis is a species of plant in the family Lamiaceae. It is native to the Bismarck Archipelago in Papuasia and some islands of the south Pacific: Fiji, the Marquesas Islands, Niue, the Pitcairn Islands, Samoa, the Society Islands, Tonga, the Tuamotu Islands, the Tubuai Islands, and Wallis and Futuna.

References

tahitensis
Flora of the Bismarck Archipelago
Flora of Fiji
Flora of the Marquesas Islands
Flora of Niue
Flora of the Pitcairn Islands
Flora of Samoa
Flora of the Society Islands
Flora of Tonga
Flora of the Tuamotus
Flora of the Tubuai Islands
Flora of Wallis and Futuna
Least concern plants
Taxonomy articles created by Polbot
Plants described in 1847